Doctors is a British medical soap opera which began broadcasting on BBC One on 26 March 2000. Set in the fictional West Midlands town of Letherbridge, the soap follows the lives of the staff and patients of the Mill Health Centre, a fictional NHS doctor's surgery, as well as its two sister surgeries, the University of Letherbridge Campus Surgery and Sutton Vale Surgery. The following is a list of characters who formerly appeared in the programme, listed in order of last appearance. In the case that more than one actor portrayed a character, the most recent actor portraying the character is listed last.

The original nine regular characters to be introduced in Doctors were Mac McGuire (Christopher Timothy), Steve Rawlings (Mark Frost), Helen Thompson (Corrinne Wicks), Rana Mistry (Akbar Kurtha), Caroline Powers (Jacqueline Leonard), Kate McGuire (Maggie Cronin), Anoushka Flynn (Carli Norris), Ruth Harding (Yvonne Brewster) and Joanna Helm (Sarah Manners), all of whom have since left. In the early 2000s, the Woodson family consisting of Ronnie (Seán Gleeson), George (Stirling Gallacher) and Bracken (Jessica Gallacher) were introduced, with the family appearing until the later half of the decade. The late 2000s also saw the departures of regulars Vivien March (Anita Carey), Archie Hallam (Matt Kennard) and Melody Bell (Elizabeth Bower). The early 2010s featured the exits of several regular characters, including Michelle Corrigan (Donnaleigh Bailey), Lily Hassan (Seeta Indrani), Ruth Pearce (Selina Chilton), Simon Bond (David Sturzaker) and Freya Wilson (Lu Corfield). In 2013, producers wrote three characters out of the series, with Jack Hollins (Nicolas Woodman), Imogen Hollins (Charlie Clemmow) and Elaine Cassidy (Janet Dibley) exiting.

2015 saw Ian Kelsey leave his role as Howard Bellamy after three years due to the heavy filming schedule; his exit saw his character killed off. 2019 saw the exit of mainstay character Mrs Tembe (Lorna Laidlaw), who had gone from the receptionist to the practice manager of the Mill during her tenure. She was replaced by manager Becky Clarke (Ali Bastian), who left nine months into her tenure so that Bastian could focus on getting pregnant in real life. 2020 saw a brief guest appearance from former regular Julia Parsons (Diane Keen), who had originally appeared in Doctors from 2003 to 2012. Later that year, another mainstay, Ayesha Lee (Laura Rollins), left the soap. 2022 then saw the exits of Izzie Torres (Bethan Moore) and Valerie Pitman (Sarah Moyle)

2000s

2010s

2020s

References

External links
 Former characters on BBC Online
 Cast and characters on IMDb

Doctors